Beder may refer to:
 Beder (ancient ruler), a claimed Tjeker ruler in ancient Egypt
 Beder, Croatia, a settlement near Samobor
 Beder, Denmark, a town and suburb of Aarhus
 Bedër University, a university in Tirana, Albania

People with the surname
 Sharon Beder, Australian environmentalist and academic

People with the given name
 Beder Caicedo (born 1992), Ecuadorian footballer

See also
 Bedar (disambiguation)
 Bedder, a housekeeper in a college of the University of Cambridge